The Digaro (Digarish), Northern Mishmi (Mishmic), or Kera'a–Tawrã languages are a small family of possibly Sino-Tibetan languages spoken by the Mishmi people of southeastern Tibet and Arunachal Pradesh.

The languages are Idu  and Taraon (Digaro, Darang).

External relationships
They are not related to the Southern Mishmi Midzu languages, apart from possibly being Sino-Tibetan. However, Blench and Post (2011) suggests that they may not even be Sino-Tibetan, but rather an independent language family of their own.

Blench (2014) classifies the Digaro languages as part of the Greater Siangic group of languages.

Names
Autonyms and exonyms for Digaro-speaking peoples, as well as Miju (Kaman), are given below (Jiang, et al. 2013:2-3).

Registers
Idu, Tawra, Kman, and Meyor all share a system of multiple language registers, which are (Blench 2016):
ordinary speech
speech of hunters: lexical substitution, the replacement of animal names and others by special lexical forms, and sometimes short poems
speech of priests/shamans: more complex, involving much language which is difficult to understand, and also lengthy descriptions of sacrificial animals
poetic/lyrical register (not in Idu, but appears in Kman)
mediation register (only in Idu?)
babytalk register

References

 Blench, Roger (2011) (De)classifying Arunachal languages: Reconstructing the evidence
 Blench, Roger (2014). Fallen leaves blow away: a neo-Hammarstromian approach to Sino-Tibetan classification. Presentation given at the University of New England, Armidale, 6 September 2014.
 Blench, Roger. 2017. The ‘Mishmi’ languages, Idu, Tawra and Kman: a mismatch between cultural and linguistic relations.
 Jiang Huo [江获], Li Daqin [李大勤], Sun Hongkai [孙宏开] (2013). A study of Taraon [达让语研]. Beijing: Ethnic Publishing House [民族出版社]. 
 van Driem, George (2001) Languages of the Himalayas: An Ethnolinguistic Handbook of the Greater Himalayan Region. Brill.

 
Greater Siangic languages

Languages of India
Proposed language families